Isabella (i.e. "Isabella Duchess of the Devils")  is an Italian comic book series created by  Giorgio Cavedon as the writer and Sandro Angiolini as artist.

History  
The series started in 1966 and it was inspired in plot and title by the renowned novel Angélique, the Marquise of the Angels and its on-screen adaptation, which had had a significant success at the Italian box office. Set in 17th century France,  it features the adventures of Isabella de Frissac, an uninhibited noblewoman  who works as a secret agent for cardinal Richelieu and, in the course if her missions, faces any sort of vexation and torture.

The series is considered a progenitor of Italian adult comics, especially because of its sado-masochistic elements, which were an absolute innovation in the fumetti panorama. The storylines also included grotesque situations, such as a scene in episode 8 which depicted the protagonist being raped by a bear.

Starting from July 1969 Gaspare De Fiore and Umberto Sammarini replaced Angiolini as artists. Publications ceased in October 1976, after 263 issues.

A comic book collection series, Isabella Gigante was published between 1969 and 1971.

Legacy 
A film adaptation, Isabella, Duchess of the Devils, directed by Bruno Corbucci and starring Brigitte Skay in the title role, was released in 1969.

The comic book also inspired a series of novels, Le memorie di Isabella.

References 

Italian comics titles
Isabella
Isabella
1966 comics debuts
Isabella
Isabella
Adventure comics
BDSM literature
Comics about women
Female characters in comics
Comics set in the 17th century
Comics set in France
Italian comics adapted into films